Ghalajeh tunnel (Persian: تونل قلاجه) or Arba'een tunnel is a tunnel half of which is located in Eyvan County in Ilam Province and the other half in Gwawar District of Gilan-e Gharb County in Kermanshah Province of Iran. It connects Ilam Province northward to Kermanshah Province. Inaugurated in 2017 with a length of 2.500 meters, it was the third-longest tunnel in Iran. By eliminating Ghalajeh Mountain Pass, the tunnel has made the route 15 Kms shorter. It is part of road 17 (Iran).

See also
Ghalajeh Protected Area
Eyvan
Eslamabad-e Gharb
Gilan-e Gharb
Road 48
Payambare Azam tunnel

References

Tunnels in Iran
Eyvan County
Ilam Province